Stanley Clarke is the second solo album by jazz fusion bassist Stanley Clarke.

Track listing
All tracks composed by Stanley Clarke; except where indicated

Side One
 "Vulcan Princess" – 4:00
 "Yesterday Princess" (Clarke, Carolyn Clarke) – 1:41
 "Lopsy Lu" – 7:03
 "Power" – 7:20

Side Two
 "Spanish Phases for Strings & Bass" (Michael Gibbs) – 6:26
 "Life Suite" – 13:47
 Part I – 1:51
 Part II – 4:12
 Part III – 1:03
 Part IV – 6:41

Personnel
 Stanley Clarke – bass guitar, double bass, guitar, piano, vocals
 Jan Hammer – keyboards
 Bill Connors – guitar
 Tony Williams – drums
 Airto Moreira – percussion on "Life Suite"
 David Taylor – trombone, brasses
 Jon Faddis, James Buffington, Lew Soloff, Garnett Brown, Peter Gordon – brasses
 David Nadien, Charles McCracken, Jesse Levy, Carol Buck, Beverly Lauridsen, Harry Cykman, Harold Kohon, Paul Gershman, Harry Lookofsky, Emanuel Green – string section
 Michael Gibbs – string & brass arrangement

Production
 Stanley Clarke – producer
 Ken Scott – engineer 
 Brian Gardner – mastering engineer
 Dave Whitman – assistant engineer

References

1974 albums
Epic Records albums
Stanley Clarke albums
Jazz-funk albums
Albums recorded at Electric Lady Studios
Albums produced by Stanley Clarke